Sergei Igorevich Popov (born 22 February 1987) is a former Russian professional football player.

Club career
He made his debut for FC Shinnik Yaroslavl on 2 July 2006 in a Russian Cup against FC Dynamo Bryansk.

External links
 
 

1987 births
Living people
Russian footballers
Association football defenders
FC Shinnik Yaroslavl players
FC Dynamo Vologda players